Saihou Sarr (born 16 August 1951 in The Gambia) is a Gambian retired footballer.

References

Gambian footballers
Living people
1951 births
Association football midfielders
The Gambia international footballers